Şişli Plaza is a tower in Istanbul, Turkey and has 40 residential floors, but rises above a 4-floor retail facility and has a 2-floor radio station on top; making an overall total of 46 floors above ground.  
- The floor-to-floor heights of the residential flats are 3.50 metres, while those of the retail facility are 4.00 metres. The radio station floors on top are higher than the standard residential floors.  
- The Şişli Plaza project, which is built on  land and has an interior area of  consists of three residential blocks. Blocks A and C have 9 floors, while block B (the residential tower) has 46 floors.

See also
 Istanbul
 List of tallest buildings in Istanbul
 List of tallest buildings in Turkey
 List of tallest buildings in Europe

External links
 Emporis Buildings Database - Sisli Plaza

Buildings and structures in Istanbul
Buildings and structures completed in 2007
Şişli
Residential skyscrapers in Istanbul
Skyscrapers in Istanbul
21st-century architecture in Turkey